Depot Creek is a river in Nipissing District in Northeastern Ontario, Canada. It is in the Saint Lawrence River drainage basin, is a tributary of Grand Lake on the Barron River, and lies entirely within Algonquin Provincial Park.

The creek begins at an unnamed lake in geographic Edgar Township  and flows north to Francis Lake, then turns east to Pretty Lake. It heads south, passes into geographic Barron Township, and reaches its mouth at Grand Lake. Grand Lake flows via the Barron River, the Petawawa River and the Ottawa River to the Saint Lawrence River.

See also
List of rivers of Ontario

References

Sources

Rivers of Nipissing District